Fana Håndball (also known short as Fana) is the women's handball team of the Norwegian multi-sports club Fana IL based in Bergen. The team plays in REMA 1000-ligaen, the top division in the country, since its historical promotion on March 14, 2018.

Another historic event happened on 10 December 2022, when they qualified for the 2022–23 Women's EHF European League, for the first time in the club's history.

Team

Current squad
Squad for the 2022–23 season

Goalkeepers
 1  Olivia Lykke Nygaard
 12  Maylee Xu
 16  Ida Drønen
Wingers
RW
 4  Linnea Skadal Kyrkjeeide
 9  Maren Gabrielsen
 21  Nora Hagerup
LW 
 5  Maren Eriksen Langø 
 7  Sara Berg
 17  Martine Vindheim
 19  Maria Haldorsen
Line players
 3  Maria Elisabeth Grasdal
 14  Eline Mangen Solbakken
 37  Oda Mastad

Back players
LB
 8  Aurora Kjellevold Hatle
 13  Andrea Solstad
 18  Marit Ova Bøyum
CB
 6  Lina Waage Mossestad
 15  Leah Osa
RB
 11  Celine Solstad

Transfers
Transfers for the 2023–24 season

Joining
  Dina Frisendal (GK) (from  Charlottenlund SK)

Leaving
  Olivia Lykke Nygaard (GK) (to  Storhamar HE)
  Aurora Kjellevold Hatle (LB) (to  Byåsen HE)

Technical staff
 Head coach: Erlend Lyssand
 Assistant coach: Catharina Furnes

Notable former National Team players

  Emilie Hovden

Notable former club players

  Josefine Gundersen Lien
  Maren Roll Lied
  Thea Stankiewicz
  Catharina Skorpen Furnes
  Synna Lien
  Sofie Grønlund
  Sofie Vinde Norum
  Christine Alver

Statistics

Top scorers in REMA 1000-ligaen
(All-Time) – Last updated on 30 November 2022

Top scorers in EHF European League
(All-Time) – Last updated on 18 February 2023

European record

References

Norwegian handball clubs
Sport in Bergen
Handball clubs established in 1945
1945 establishments in Norway